M. Muthaiya  is an Indian film director and screenwriter who works in Tamil cinema.

Career
Muthaiya moved to Chennai from Srivilliputhur in Virudhunagar to make movies and debuted with the rural drama Kutti Puli (2013) starring Sasikumar. The film did not receive favorable reviews from the media but went on to perform well at the box office.

Muthaiya moved on to make Komban (2015), a story set in the Ramanathapuram district starring Karthi, Lakshmi Menon, and Rajkiran. The film is about an aggressive man (Karthi) and his relationship with his father-in-law (Rajkiran). Muthaiya, inspired by the egotistical tussles between his father and his grandmother, scripted the story straight from his own experiences. The release of Komban was mired by controversy when protesters claimed that the story revolved around the animosity between different Thevar caste groups and that it therefore had the potential to incite violence in southern districts of Tamil Nadu. After a brief legal battle, the film opened to positive reviews and did well commercially.

Following the success of Komban, Muthaiya made Marudhu (2016), featuring Vishal and Sridivya in the lead roles.

In 2017, Muthaiya reunited with Sasikumar to make another rural drama film titled Kodiveeran. Prior to the release of the film, the film's producer committed suicide due to financial problems.

In January 2018, Muthaiya began work on Devarattam, a second film with Studio Green, which features a brother-sisters relationship with Gautham Karthik in the lead role. The film released on 1 May 2019. Overall, the film is an average rural action entertainer with routine elements which may work for audiences in Madurai, Tirunelveli and surrounding areas.

Muthaiya has followed the same successful style in Pulikkuthi Pandi (2021), which stars Vikram Prabhu and Lakshmi Menon comparing their previous film. Pulikkuthi Pandi is Lakshmi Menon's third film under Muthaiah's direction, and the film also marks the actress's comeback to big screens after four years of film.

In August 2022, Muthaiya's much expected Viruman, the first time under the banner of 2D Entertainment was released. The film features Karthi in the lead role, marking his second collaboration with Muthaiah, and was produced by Suriya and Jyothika. The film claimed to be an overall hit on a commercial basis even though it critically attained mixed reviews, like Muthaiya's previous movies. Aditi Shankar the daughter of most celebrated Indian director S. Shankar, made her acting debut as the female lead.

Filmmaking style
Muthaiya is known for his regional village and caste-oriented based scripts and mostly directs Madurai, Ramanathapuram, Virudhunagar, Theni, and Tenkasi-based movies.

Filmography

References

External links

Living people
Tamil film directors
Tamil-language film directors
Tamil screenwriters
21st-century Indian film directors
Film directors from Tamil Nadu
Screenwriters from Tamil Nadu
Year of birth missing (living people)